The John Ross House in Durban, South Africa is a 33-storey skyscraper on Victoria Embankment.

It is named after "John Ross" (real name, Charles Rawden Maclean), who at the age of 15 walked from Port Natal to Delagoa Bay and back to procure medicine and supplies. His statue stands outside the building.

On top of the tower is the Roma Revolving Restaurant. The building is 109 metres (358 feet) high and was renovated in 2009.

See also
 List of restaurants in South Africa

References

Skyscrapers in Durban
Restaurants in South Africa
Buildings and structures with revolving restaurants
Office buildings completed in 1973
20th-century architecture in South Africa